Yelizaveta Dementyeva (5 March 1928 – 27 July 2022) was a Soviet sprint canoer who competed in the late 1950s. At the 1956 Summer Olympics in Melbourne, she won a gold medal in the K-1 500 m event. Dementyeva also won two medals at the 1958 ICF Canoe Sprint World Championships in Prague with a gold in the K-1 500 m and a silver in the K-2 500 m events.

References

External links

Yelizaveta Dementyeva's profile at Sports Reference.com

1928 births
2022 deaths
Canoeists at the 1956 Summer Olympics
Olympic canoeists of the Soviet Union
Olympic gold medalists for the Soviet Union
Soviet female canoeists
Olympic medalists in canoeing
Russian female canoeists
ICF Canoe Sprint World Championships medalists in kayak
Medalists at the 1956 Summer Olympics
Honoured Masters of Sport of the USSR